The Federal Police, formerly known as the  (Federal Preventive Police) and sometimes referred to in the U.S. as "Federales", was a Mexican national police force formed in 1999 and folded into the National Guard in 2019. It operated under the authority of the Department of Security and Civil Protection.

The Federal Police was formed through the merger of four previously independent federal police agencies — the Federal Highway Police, the Fiscal Police, the Investigation and National Security Center, and the Mexican Army's 3rd Military Police Brigade — and was initially referred to as the Federal Preventive Police.

Throughout its 20 year existence, the Federal Police was dogged by allegations of widespread corruption and abuse — allegations which President Andrés Manuel López Obrador said influenced his administration's decision to disband the force. Since its disbandment, two high-ranking commanders have been arrested for offences they committed while leading the Federal Police.

The police force was 1,870,406,000 pesos in debt to creditors, members of the public, and former employees when it was disbanded.

History

On May 29, 2009, the Federal Preventive Police name was changed to Federal Police, and some duties were added to it. The Federal Police was created as the main Federal Preventive Police in 1999 by the initiative of President Ernesto Zedillo (1994–2000) to prevent and combat and to enforce the law that drugs will not run around on Mexico's streets. The PF has been assuming its authority in stages over time, as its budget has grown and it has combined and reorganized police departments from major agencies such as those for migration, treasury, and highways. Many large bus stations and airports in Mexico are assigned a PF detachment.

Public Safety Secretary Genaro García Luna hoped to reform the nation's long-troubled police. Among other steps, he consolidated several agencies into a Federal Police force of nearly 25,000.

The Federal Police celebrates its anniversary on July 13 every year (Federal Police Day), with its history dating to 1928 as the successor of the agencies mentioned above.

Mexican Federal Preventive Police

The Mexican Federal Preventive Police was an agency created from the Mexican Highway Patrol in 1999. It was replaced by the Mexican Federal Police due to corruption problems and bribing issues. On May 30, 2009, the Mexican Federal Police took over the PFP's duties as the Federal Ministerial Police took over the Mexican federal Investigative Agency's duties.

Calderón's administration

When Felipe Calderón took office as president in 2006, there were roughly half a dozen drug cartels in Mexico. Each of the organizations were large and dominated huge parts of Mexico's territorial landscape, and operated internationally and overseas as well. When Calderón assumed the presidency, he realized that he could not rely on the federal police nor the intelligence agencies to restore order and crack down the logistics of the mafias. Over several decades, the cartels had bribed police commanders and top politicians; and often riddled with corruption, state authorities would not only fail to cooperate with other authorities in distinct federal levels, but would actively protect the cartels and their leaders. With limited options available, Calderón turned to the Mexican Armed Forces, which, because of its limited involvement in acting against the cartels, remained relatively immune to corruption and organized crime infiltration. He then moved the military to parts of Mexico most plagued by drug-violence to target, capture, and – if necessary – kill the leaders of the drug trafficking organizations. Yet, the president understood that the military could not fight the cartels alone and needed cops to rely on for patrolling, collecting intelligence information, and gathering evidences necessary to prosecute drug traffickers.

With the argument that he was tired of the corruption, Calderón abolished the AFI agency created in May 2009 and created an entirely new police force. The new force has formed part of Mexico's first national crime information system, which stores the fingerprints of everyone arrested in the country. They also have assumed the role of the Army in several parts of the country. According to The New York Times, the federal police has avoided "any serious incidents of corruption."

On October 21, 2008, President Felipe Calderón proposed to break the former Federal Preventive Police to replace it with a different organization, because "the PFP has not yielded the expected results and has not been a strong institution capable of serving as a model for all police services in the country." The new corporation became the Federal Police, and it provides support to the police as to the Federal District, states and municipalities. This decision was said to be not entirely unexpected, given the insufficient number of convictions, the alarming increase of violence, abductions and cases of corruption and complicity with organized crime elements.

Peña Nieto's administration 

In 2012, it was reported that President Enrique Peña Nieto's government had proposed the creation of a new unit to replace all Federal Police duties.  Federal Police would not be disbanded but would be assigned to special tasks & missions.  Additional information on Mexico's planned Gendarmerie ("The 'National Gendarmerie' and Mexico's Crime Fighting Plans," MexiData.info, Dec. 24, 2012).

The final product is the 2014 creation of the Federal Police's Gendarmerie Division, with 5,000 police agents. Its focus is on providing ongoing public security in areas with heavy criminal activities and providing border security. It is also expected to reinforce state, city and municipal police forces when the need arises. It is one of the seven constituent divisions of the Federal Police reporting directly to the Commissioner, and the newest to be raised.

The National Gendarmerie is defined as a military grade force within the Federal Police.

Lopez Obrador's administration

Before becoming President of Mexico, Andrés Manuel López Obrador campaigned on a promise to take the military off the streets of Mexico. Shortly after getting into office, Obrador released a plan to create the National Guard under control of the Mexican Armed Forces which would be in charge of "preventing and combating crime". Obrador stated that the new National Guard would be critical to solving Mexico's ongoing security crisis.

On 28 February, the Mexico's General Congress voted to approve a 60,000-member national guard. On 30 June 2019, the National Guard was officially established in the Constitution of Mexico.

The new National Guard, de facto successor to a similar formation raised in 1821 and abolished in 1935, is composed today of personnel from parts of both the National Gendarmerie and Federal Forces Divisions of the Federal Police.

Strength
In 2000, the PF had 10,878 agents and staff:
 4,899 from the Mexican army's 3rd Brigade of the Military Police, included two military police battalions and an Assault Battalion.
 4,000 from the Federal Highway Police
 1,500 from the Fiscal Police (Policía Fiscal Federal)
 600 from the Interior Ministry's Center of National Security And Investigation – Mexican intelligence agency.

Organization

Regulation of the Law of the Federal Police in the Official Gazette of May 17, 2010, to establish the basic organizational structure of this Decentralized Administrative Body, Article 5 of that system, comprising a total of 136 seats of middle and senior management, broken 130 seats structure, as shown below:
1 General Commissioner;
7 Divisions: Intelligence Research, Regional Security; Scientific, Drug, Federal and Gendarmerie Forces;
1 General Secretariat;
1 Internal Affairs;
20 Coordination;
66 DGs;
6 DGs in aid to the Chief of the Division of Regional Security;
32 State Coordination at the regional level; and
1 Head of Internal Affairs.

Commissioner General
 General Vargas Pitt Azian of Legal Affairs
 Directorate General of Information
 Directorate General of Social Communication
 Directorate General of Planning and Coordination

Intelligence Division
 Coordination of Technical Services
 General Directorate of Technical Monitoring Center
 Directorate General of the Center for Risk Alert and Response
 Directorate General for Development and Operation of Coverage
 Covert Operations Coordination
 Directorate General Operations and Infiltration
 Directorate General of Recruitment and Resource Management
 Directorate General for Supervision and Surveillance
 Coordination Analysis and International Liaison
 Directorate General of Analysis and Statistics
 Directorate General for International Police Affairs
 Indicators DG Information Integration

Research Division
 Research Coordination Office
 Directorate General of Tactical Analysis
 General Directorate of Criminal Records and Records
 Directorate General for Crisis Management and Negotiation
 Coordination of Field Research
 DG Research of Crimes against the Security and Integrity of Persons
 Directorate General for Research of Crimes High Impact
 DG Research of Federal Crimes
Technical Research Coordination and Operation
 Directorate General of Technical Operations
Directorate General of Operational Intelligence
Directorate General Tactical Support

Regional Security Division
 DG Personnel
 DG Information
 Directorate General Operations
 Department of Logistics and Training
 Directorate General of Planning and Supervision
 Directorate General of Operational Control
 State Coordinators (32)
 Regional Coordination Zones (5)
 Central Regional Coordination Zone
 Northeast Regional Coordination Zone
 Northwest Regional Coordination Zone
 West Regional Coordination Zone
 Southeast Regional Coordination Zone

Scientific Division
 For the Prevention of Electronic Crimes
 Department Cyber Crimes Prevention
 CERT-MX – Centre of Expertise in Technological Response
 DG Laboratories in Electronics and Forensic Investigation
 Coordination of Technological Innovation
 Directorate General for Emerging Information Technologies
 Department of Infrastructure and Implementation of Technological Processes
 Directorate General for Innovation and Development
 Coordination of Criminology
 Directorate General of Criminal Behavior
 DG Laboratories
 DG Specialties

Drug Division
 Drug Research Coordination Office
 Tactical Analysis Directorate General of Drug
 Directorate General of Records and Registration of Drug Trafficking and Related Crimes
 Liaison Department and Institutional Cooperation
 Field Research Coordination and Technical Drug
 Directorate General of Technical Operation Drug
 Directorate General of Drug Intelligence Operations
 Directorate General Tactical Support against Drug Trafficking and Related Crimes
 Research Coordination Illicit Resources
 Directorate General of Tactical Analysis of Crimes Financial System
 Financial Intelligence Directorate for Prevention
 Prevention Directorate General Operations Illicit Resources

Federal Forces Division
 Coordination for Law and Order Restoration
 Directorate General for Force Protection
 Directorate General for Rescue Operations and Civil Support
 Directorate General of Prison Transfers and Support
 Coordination of Immediate Quick Reaction Forces
 Directorate General of Physical Security
 Directorate General for Quick Action Forces
 Directorate General of the Canine Units
 Coordination of Special Operations
 Directorate General of Intervention
 Directorate General of Explosives
 Directorate General of Special Equipment

National Gendarmerie Division
See article: National Gendarmerie (Mexico)

Coordination Bureau of the National Gendarmerie
 Directorate General of Planning and Logistics
 Directorate General of Strategic Operations and Special Units of the Gendarmerie
 Directorate General of Social Services and Public Affairs

General Secretary
 Coordination of General Services
 Directorate General of Human Resources
 Directorate General of Financial Resources
 Department of Material Resources
 Air Operations Coordination
 Directorate General Operations
 Directorate General Maintenance
 Directorate General for Aviation and Safety Supervision
 Coordination Technical Support
 Department of Information
 Directorate General of Telecommunications
 Directorate General of Technical Facilities and Maintenance
 Police Coordination System Development
 Control Directorate General Trust
 Directorate General of Civil Service System and Disciplinary
 Directorate-General for Education and Professionalization

Internal Affairs
 Directorate General for Internal Oversight Monitoring and
 Directorate General for Internal Investigation
 Directorate General Accountability

Internal Control

Superior Academy of Public Security of the Federal Police
 Directorate General;
 Directorate-General for Administration;
 Academic Board;
 Preceptory address
 Services Division

Divisions

The Policía Federal consists of seven branches of service, known as divisions, administered by a central administration called the General Secretariat

 Anti-drug Division – 
 Scientific Division – 
 Federal Forces Division – 
 Intelligence Division – 
 Investigation Division – 
 Regional Security Division – 
 National Gendarmerie Division – 

There is also a separate Internal Affairs Unit.

2010 included the  approx 35,000 civil servants on. A Comisionado General (General Manager), which is used directly by the President of Mexico, heads with wide-ranging powers the institution. Maribel Cervantes Guerrero broke off in February 2012 Facundo Rosas Rosas, who held this office since 2009 .

The Special Operations Group (GOPES) is the police elite counter terror hostage rescue unit.

Ranks

Commissioned officers

Basic scale ladder

The ranks from Commissioner to Commissioner General wear more complex rank insignia involving the seven-pointed star of the Federal Police badge above one to four five-pointed stars placed between two stripes.

Equipment

Weapons

Pistols
 Glock pistol
 Heckler & Koch USP
 Jericho 941
 CZ P-09

Submachine guns
 Colt 9 mm SMG
 Heckler & Koch MP5
 Heckler & Koch MP7
 Heckler & Koch UMP
 Uzi

Assault rifles
 Beretta AR70/90
 Beretta ARX 160
 CZ-805 BREN
 FN FAL
 Galil ACE
 Heckler & Koch G3

Sniper rifles
 Barrett M82
 DSR-50
 Heckler & Koch MSG90

Machine guns
 FN MAG
 FN Minimi
 Heckler & Koch HK21
 IMI Negev
 M2 Browning
 M60E4

Shotguns
 Mossberg 500

Grenade Launchers
 Heckler & Koch AG36
 Milkor MGL

Transport
The PF has many vehicles; land, sea and air, it is estimated to own more than 17,000 patrol cars. The exact information regarding transport vehicles and aircraft that comprise the fleet of the Federal Police is classified, to protect the life and efficiency of agents.

Rotary wing and fixed wing pilot training takes place in the school of Naval Aviation located on Las Bajadas, Veracruz.

Aircraft

See also

 Attorney General of Mexico 
 Crime in Mexico
 Federales
 Grupo de Operaciones Especiales (Mexico)
 Rurales
 Mexican Drug War
 United States Marshals Service

References

External links
 PF Official site – English
 Official site 
 Statistics of Crime in Mexico 
 Photos of PF cars
 Federal Police Forces
 Police Forces in Mexico

Gendarmerie
Mexican drug war
Drug control law enforcement agencies
Defunct law enforcement agencies of Mexico
Mexico